The Divine Jetta is a 1937 German musical comedy film directed by Erich Waschneck and starring Grethe Weiser, Viktor de Kowa, and Marina von Ditmar.

Cast

References

Bibliography

External links 
 

1937 films
1930s historical comedy films
German historical comedy films
1937 musical comedy films
German musical comedy films
Films of Nazi Germany
1930s German-language films
Films directed by Erich Waschneck
Films set in the 1900s
Films set in Berlin
Films about singers
Tobis Film films
German black-and-white films
1930s historical musical films
German historical musical films
1930s German films